The international tournament organised by Netanya Chess Club started in 1961. The most famous competition took place in 1968 when Robert James Fischer won (scoring 11.5/13) ahead of Daniel Yanofsky and Moshe Czerniak.

Netanya International Chess Tournament

{| class="sortable wikitable"
! # !!Year !! Winner
|-
| 1 || 1961 ||      
|-
| 2 || 1964 ||	 
|-
| 3 || 1965 ||  
|-
| 4 || 1968 ||  
|-
| 5 || 1969 || 
|-
| 6 || 1971 ||   
|-
| 7 || 1973 || 
|-
| 8 || 1975 || 
|-
| 9 || 1976 ||   
|-
| 10 || 1977 || 
|-
| ? || ? || ?
|-
| ? || 1983 || 
|}

References

External links
 Portal page of chess in Netanya: http://netanyachess.com/en_ev/events.en.htm

Chess competitions
Chess in Israel
1961 in chess
Recurring sporting events established in 1961
1961 establishments in Israel
Recurring sporting events disestablished in 1983
1983 disestablishments in Israel